Woolsey Creek is a stream in Camden and Laclede counties the Ozarks of south central Missouri. Woolsey Creek is a tributary to the Niangua River. The stream enters the Niangua just upstream (south) of Lake Niangua.

Woolsey Creek was named after Daniel Woolsey, a pioneer citizen.

See also
List of rivers of Missouri

References

Rivers of Camden County, Missouri
Rivers of Laclede County, Missouri
Rivers of Missouri